The Journal of Development Economics is a bimonthly peer-reviewed academic journal published by Elsevier. It was established in 1974 and is considered the top field journal in development economics.

Its editor-in-chief from 1985 to 2003 was Pranab Bardhan, who has been the longest-serving JDE editor to date. He followed T.N. Srinivasan, and Lance Taylor as Editors since the journal was established in 1974. He was succeeded by Mark Rosenzweig (2003-2009) and Maitreesh Ghatak (2009-2015). The current editor-in-chief is Andrew Foster, who started in 2016.

See also
The Developing Economies
The World Economy

References

External links
 
 

Economics journals
Bimonthly journals
English-language journals
Elsevier academic journals
Publications established in 1974
Development studies journals